Calvert Manor is a historic apartment building located at 1925-1927 North Calvert Street in Arlington, Virginia. It was designed by noted Washington, D.C. architect Mihran Mesrobian and built in 1948, in the Moderne style. Mesrobian was also the builder and owner of Calvert Manor.  The three-story garden apartment building is constructed of concrete block with red brick facing, highlighted by light-colored cast stone, cement brick details, and vertical bands of glass block.

On December 15, 1997, it was added to the National Register of Historic Places.

References

External links

 Arlington Historical Society listing for Calvert Manor - has a nice color photo showing the intricacy of the brickwork on the facade
 Calvert Manor, 1925-27 N. Calvert Street, Arlington, Arlington County, VA at the Historic American Buildings Survey (HABS)

Apartment buildings in Virginia
Residential buildings on the National Register of Historic Places in Virginia
Buildings and structures in Arlington County, Virginia
Residential buildings completed in 1948
Streamline Moderne architecture in Virginia
Art Deco architecture in Virginia
National Register of Historic Places in Arlington County, Virginia
Historic American Buildings Survey in Virginia